Strafford is a town in Strafford County, New Hampshire, United States. The population was 4,230 at the 2020 census. The two main settlements in town are Center Strafford and Bow Lake Village.

History 

Once part of Barrington, Strafford was set off due to the lengthy travel required to attend town meetings. Settled prior to the Revolution, the town incorporated in 1820, taking its name from the county in which it is located. Strafford County had been organized in 1773 during the administration of colonial governor John Wentworth, and named in honor of Thomas Wentworth, 1st Earl of Strafford.

The Austin Academy once stood in the center of Strafford village. George Cate, a wealthy shoe manufacturer, visited the school at the request of its principal Alvin E. Thomas and was so impressed with the school that he left at his death $200,000 on the condition that his name be added to that of Mr. Austin. After his death, the hundred-acre farm of George Washington Foss was purchased, and soon a beautiful new building, designed by well-known New Hampshire architect J. Edward Richardson, sat on the hill with the name on its façade, "Austin-Cate Academy - 1903". The property has been purchased by the state for a National Guard training center. The Foss farmhouse that was used as a dormitory burned in 1961 and was replaced with a one-story dormitory. The main building had burned in the early 1930s and was replaced with the brick building that is there now.

Geography 
Strafford is drained by the Isinglass River and its tributary the Berrys River, and by the Big River. The Isinglass River flows east to the Cocheco River in Dover and is part of the Piscataqua River watershed, while the Big River flows west to the Suncook River in Barnstead and is part of the Merrimack River watershed.

The Blue Hills Range divides the town in half, running southwest to northeast.

Adjacent municipalities
 Farmington (northeast)
 Rochester (east)
 Barrington (southeast)
 Northwood (southwest)
 Pittsfield (west)
 Barnstead (northwest)

Demographics 

As of the census of 2000, there were 3,626 people, 1,281 households, and 1,022 families residing in the town.  The population density was 73.7 people per square mile (28.5/km).  There were 1,564 housing units at an average density of 31.8 per square mile (12.3/km).  The racial makeup of the town was 98.48% White, 0.14% African American, 0.14% Native American, 0.25% Asian, 0.06% from other races, and 0.94% from two or more races. Hispanic or Latino of any race were 0.63% of the population.

There were 1,281 households, out of which 43.2% had children under the age of 18 living with them, 68.5% were married couples living together, 8.2% had a female householder with no husband present, and 20.2% were non-families. 15.1% of all households were made up of individuals, and 4.4% had someone living alone who was 65 years of age or older.  The average household size was 2.82 and the average family size was 3.14.

In the town, the population was spread out, with 30.0% under the age of 18, 4.8% from 18 to 24, 32.1% from 25 to 44, 25.4% from 45 to 64, and 7.7% who were 65 years of age or older.  The median age was 37 years. For every 100 females, there were 100.1 males.  For every 100 females age 18 and over, there were 95.1 males.

The median income for a household in the town was $59,044, and the median income for a family was $62,238. Males had a median income of $40,423 versus $30,524 for females. The per capita income for the town was $23,500.  About 1.0% of families and 1.9% of the population were below the poverty line, including 1.5% of those under age 18 and 5.4% of those age 65 or over.

Notable people 

 Charles Simic (born 1938), fifteenth US Poet Laureate (2007–2008)

References

External links
 
 New Hampshire Economic and Labor Market Information Bureau Profile

 
Towns in Strafford County, New Hampshire
Populated places established in 1820
1820 establishments in the United States
Towns in New Hampshire